HD 168607 (V4029 Sagittarii) is a blue hypergiant and luminous blue variable (LBV) star located in the constellation of Sagittarius, easy to see with amateur telescopes. It forms a pair with HD 168625, also a blue hypergiant and possible luminous blue variable, that can be seen at the south-east of M17, the Omega Nebula.

Physical properties 

HD 168607 was estimated to be about as far away as is the Omega Nebula (2.2 kiloparsecs, 7,200 light years, from the Sun) and no respective measurements have been found that discount physical association with HD 168625.

The apparent magnitude of this star or star system was observed to vary by 0.25 to 0.30 magnitudes with a period of 64 days when it was first identified as an α Cygni variable.  Unlike its neighbour HD 168625, no nebula has been found around this star.  It is classified in the General Catalogue of Variable Stars as a luminous blue variable or S Doradus variable with the variable star designation V4029 Sagittarii and a maximum and minimum visual magnitude of 8.12 and 8.29 respectively.  Although it is suspected of being in, or about to enter, an S Doradus phase, no outbursts have been observed.  A magnitude variation between 8.05 to 8.41 is reported from a broader range of observations.

HD 168607 is thought to have had a mass between  when it first formed on the main sequence, but now much less.  Analysis of its period and photospheric abundances suggest that it has evolved through a red supergiant stage and has now expelled its outer atmosphere and increased its temperature again.

References 

B-type hypergiants
Luminous blue variables
Sagittarius (constellation)
168607
Sagittarii, V4029
Durchmusterung objects
089956